Ingvald is a given name. Notable people with the name include:

Hans Ingvald Hansen Ratvik (1883–1966), Norwegian politician for the Liberal Party
Ingvald Anker Andersen (born 1866), Norwegian politician for the Conservative Party
Ingvald Bjerke (1907–1990), Norwegian boxer who competed in the 1928 Summer Olympics
Ingvald Eriksen (1884–1961), Danish gymnast who competed in the 1912 Summer Olympics
Ingvald Falch (born 1963), Norwegian judge
Ingvald Godal (1934–2019), Norwegian politician for the Centre Party and later the Conservative Party
Ingvald Haugen (1894–1958), Norwegian labour union leader and politician for the Labour Party
Ingvald Huseklepp (born 1949), former Norwegian footballer who played four seasons for SK Brann
Ingvald Johan Ulveseth (born 1924), Norwegian politician for the Labour Party
Ingvald Johannes Jaklin (1896–1966), Norwegian politician for the Labour Party
Ingvald Svinsås-Lo (1897–1980), Norwegian politician for the Liberal Party
Ingvald Tøndel (1887–1952), Norwegian politician for the Christian Democratic Party

Norwegian masculine given names